Beverly Lake may refer to:

People
 I. Beverly Lake (born 1934), American jurist and public official
 I. Beverly Lake, Sr. (1906–1996), North Carolina jurist, law professor at Wake Forest University and Campbell University, and politician

Places
 Beverly Lake (Nunavut), Canada
 Lower Beverley Lake, Delta, Ontario, Canada

Lake, Beverly